Hohenthurm is a village and a former municipality in the Saalekreis district, Saxony-Anhalt, Germany. Since 1 September 2010, it is part of the town Landsberg.

References

Former municipalities in Saxony-Anhalt
Landsberg, Saxony-Anhalt